The Daxing Massacre, also known as the Daxing Incident, was part of the Red August massacre in Beijing during the early Cultural Revolution. It took place in Daxing District of Beijing from August 27 to 31, primarily targeting members of the Five Black Categories. In total, 325 people were killed in the massacre by September 1, 1966; the oldest killed was 80 years old, while the youngest was only 38 days old; 22 families were wiped out.

The Daxing Massacre occurred after Mao Zedong publicly supporting Red Guards' movement in Beijing and Xie Fuzhi, the Minister of Ministry of Public Security, ordering to protect the Red Guards and not arrest them; on August 26, 1966, the day before the massacre began, Xie stated that it was not incorrect for the Red Guards to beat "bad people", and it was fine if the "bad people" were killed. Methods of slaughter during the Daxing massacre included beating, whipping, strangling, trampling, beheading and so on; in particular, the method used to kill most infants and children were knocking them against the ground or slicing them in halves.

See also 

 Red August
 Red Terror

References 

Massacres in China
Political controversies in China
Political repression in China
1966 in Asia
1966 in China
1960s in Beijing
Man-made disasters in China